Andrew Potter is a Canadian author and associate professor (professional) at the Max Bell School of Public Policy in Montreal, where he is based. He is the former editor-in-chief of the Ottawa Citizen; best known for co-authoring The Rebel Sell, with Joseph Heath, and for his 2010 book, The Authenticity Hoax. He was formerly director of the McGill Institute for the Study of Canada.

Early life and education

Potter was born in Teulon, Manitoba, and attended Glebe Collegiate Institute in Ottawa before graduating from McGill University with a BA in Philosophy, followed by MA and Ph.D. degrees in philosophy at the University of Toronto. He also spent three years as an assistant professor at Trent University. Potter completed postdoctoral work at the Centre de recherches en éthique (CREUM) at the University of Montreal after graduation.

Career

Potter taught philosophy at Trent University in Peterborough, Ontario, from 2001 to 2004. He then left academia to become the National Editor at the Ottawa Citizen, a daily newspaper. In 2010 Potter left the Ottawa Citizen, when he was appointed Features Editor at Canadian Business in Toronto. From 2007 to 2012 Potter wrote a column for the Canadian national weekly news Maclean's magazine. Andrew Potter also served as Director of the Montreal-based McGill Institute for the Study of Canada (MISC).

Potter returned to the Ottawa Citizen to become Managing Editor in 2011 and was promoted to Editor-In-Chief in December 2013. In 2013, Potter and the Ottawa Citizen were awarded the Michener Award for reporting that exposed the use of    "robocalls" to mislead and harass voters during the 2011 federal election campaign.

In March 2017, Andrew Potter published an article in Maclean's in which he talks about the lack of solidarity within Quebec society. This article was decried and denounced at the provincial legislature of Quebec, and the administration of McGill tweeted that Potter did not represent the views of the university. A few days after the publication of his article, Potter distanced himself from elements of his article and soon after resigned from his position at MISC, while remaining an associate professor. Distinguished national affairs commentators including Paul Wells and former Maclean's national editor Andrew Coyne questioned or condemned the backlash, specifically the perceived yielding to political pressure by an academic institution.

Academic interests 
Potter's academic background is in metaphysics and political philosophy, post-secondary educational policy, branding, consumerism and popular culture. He maintains an interest in technology and the future of the news media.

Selected publications
 The Rebel Sell
 The Authenticity Hoax
 "How a snowstorm exposed Quebec’s real problem: social malaise"

References 

Living people
Ottawa Citizen people
Canadian newspaper editors
Canadian male journalists
Maclean's writers and editors
1972 births
Canadian academic administrators
Academic staff of McGill University
Philosophers of culture
21st-century Canadian philosophers
Metaphysicians
Canadian political philosophers
Branding theorists
Popular culture studies
Academic staff of Trent University
University of Toronto alumni